UNESCO designated the Routes of Santiago de Compostela in France as a World Heritage Site in December 1998. The routes pass through the following regions of France: Aquitaine, Auvergne, Basse-Normandie, Bourgogne, Centre, Champagne-Ardenne, Ile-de-France, Languedoc-Roussillon, Limousin, Midi-Pyrénées, Picardie, Poitou-Charentes, and Provence-Alpes-Côte d'Azur. UNESCO cites the routes' role in "religious and cultural exchange", the development of "specialized edifices" along the routes, and their "exceptional witness to the power and influence of Christian faith among people of all classes and countries in Europe during the Middle Ages".

UNESCO designated 71 structures along the routes and seven stretches of the Chemin du Puy. The structures are largely monuments, churches, or hospitals that provided services to pilgrims headed to Santiago de Compostela in Spain. Some are places of pilgrimage in their own right. Other structures include a tower, a bridge, and a city gate.

Structures
The sites included in the UNESCO designation are largely monuments, churches, or hospitals that provided services to pilgrims headed to Santiago de Compostela in Spain. Some are places of pilgrimage in their own right. Other structures include a tower, bridges, a city gate, and a prehistoric stone construction.

Auvergne-Rhône-Alpes
 Clermont-Ferrand: church Notre-Dame du Port
 Le Puy-en-Velay: cathedral
 Le Puy-en-Velay: Hôtel-Dieu Saint-Jacques

Bourgogne-Franche-Comté
 La Charité-sur-Loire: church Sainte-Croix-Notre-Dame
 Asquins: church Saint-Jacques d'Asquins
 Vézelay: former abbatial church Sainte-Madeleine

Centre-Val de Loire
 Neuvy-Saint-Sépulchre: collegial church Saint-Étienne (formerly collegial church Saint-Jacques) – Centre-Val de Loire
 Bourges: cathedral Saint-Étienne – Centre

Grand Est
 L'Épine: Basilica Notre-Dame de l'Épine
 Châlons-en-Champagne: church Notre-Dame-en-Vaux

Hauts-de-France
 Amiens: cathedral Notre-Dame
 Compiègne: parochial church Saint-Jacques
 Douai: Église Saint-Jacques de Douai
 Folleville: parochial church Saint-Jean-Baptiste

Île-de-France
 Paris: Saint-Jacques Tower – Île-de-France

Normandy
 Mont Saint-Michel – Lower Normandy

Nouvelle-Aquitaine
 Périgueux: cathedral Saint-Front
 Saint-Avit-Sénieur: church
 Le Buisson-de-Cadouin: former abbaye
 Bazas: former cathedral
 Bordeaux: basilica of St. Severinus
 Bordeaux: basilica of St. Michael
 Bordeaux: cathedral of St. Andrew
 La Sauve: abbey de La Sauve-Majeure
 La Sauve-Majeure: church Saint-Pierre
 Soulac-sur-Mer: church Notre-Dame-de-la-Fin-des-Terres
 Aire-sur-l'Adour: church Sainte-Quitterie
 Mimizan: bell tower
 Sorde-l'Abbaye: abbey Saint-Jean
 Saint-Sever: abbey
 Agen: cathedral Saint Caprais
 Bayonne: cathedral Sainte-Marie
 L'Hôpital-Saint-Blaise: church
 Saint-Jean-Pied-de-Port: gate Saint Jacques
 Oloron-Sainte-Marie: church Sainte Marie
 Saintes: church Sainte-Eutrope
 Saint-Jean-d'Angély: royal abbey Saint-Jean-Baptiste
 Melle: church Saint-Hilaire
 Aulnay: church Saint-Pierre
 Poitiers: church Saint-Hilaire-le-Grand
 Pons: former hospital des Pèlerins
 Saint-Léonard-de-Noblat: church Saint-Léonard

Occitanie
 Saint-Guilhem-le-Désert: former abbey de Gellone
 Aniane/Saint-Jean-de-Fos: Pont du Diable
 Saint-Gilles-du-Gard: former abbatial church
 Audressein: church of Tramesaygues
 Saint-Lizier: former cathedral and cloister, cathedral Notre-Dame-de-la-Sède, episcopal palace, rempart
 Conques: Abbey Church of Saint Foy
 Conques: bridge over the Dourdou
 Espalion: Pont-Vieux
 Estaing: bridge over the Lot
 Saint-Chély-d'Aubrac: bridge called "des pèlerins " over the Boralde
 Saint-Bertrand-de-Comminges: former cathedral Notre-Dame
 Saint-Bertrand-de-Comminges: paleo-Christian basilica, chapel Saint-Julien
 Toulouse: basilica Saint-Sernin
 Toulouse: Hôtel-Dieu Saint-Jacques
 Valcabrère: church Saint-Just
 Auch: cathedral Sainte-Marie
 Beaumont-sur-l'Osse and Larressingle: Pont d'Artigue or of Lartigue
 La Romieu: collegial church Saint-Pierre
 Cahors: cathedral Saint-Étienne
 Cahors: Valentré Bridge
 Gréalou: dolmen of Pech-Laglaire
 Figeac: hospital Saint-Jacques
 Rocamadour: church Saint-Sauveur and crypt Saint-Amadour
 Aragnouet: hospice of the Plan and chapel Notre-Dame- de-l'Assomption, aka. chapelle des Templiers
 Gavarnie: parochial church
 Jézeau: church Saint-Laurent
 Ourdis-Cotdoussan: church of Cotdussan
 Rabastens: church Notre-Dame-du-Bourg
 Moissac: abbey-church Saint-Pierre and cloister

Provence-Alpes-Côte d'Azur
 Arles: Église Saint-Honorat

References

External links

 UNESCO description
 UNESCO image gallery

World Heritage Sites in France
Camino de Santiago routes